The following article presents a summary of the 1967 football (soccer) season in Brazil, which was the 66th season of competitive football in the country.

Taça Brasil

Semifinals

Final

Palmeiras declared as the Taça Brasil champions by aggregate score of 6–3.

Torneio Roberto Gomes Pedrosa

Final Stage

Palmeiras declared as the Torneio Roberto Gomes Pedrosa champions.

State championship champions

Other competition champions

Brazilian clubs in international competitions

Brazil national team
The following table lists all the games played by the Brazil national football team in official competitions and friendly matches during 1967.

References

 Brazilian competitions at RSSSF
 1967 Brazil national team matches at RSSSF

 
Seasons in Brazilian football
Brazil